Coombe is an area of the town of Teignmouth in the English county of Devon.

Populated places in Devon
Teignmouth